Aneurinibacillus humi is a Gram-positive, spore-forming, aerobic and motile bacterium from the genus of Aneurinibacillus which has been isoladed from soil from Mykhailyky in the Ukraine.

References

Paenibacillaceae
Bacteria described in 2016